The Zagato Zele 1000, 1500, 2000 (sold in the United States as the Elcar) was an electric microcar with a fiberglass body manufactured by the Italian design company Zagato. Produced 1974–1976, the Zele was an unusual departure from Zagato's famous designs, which had long been known for their beauty and performance. The Zele, however, was high, square cornered and had a low top speed. They were produced in 7 colors (Orange-red, Brown, Dark blue, Pastel blue, White, Green and metal flake Blue) and the chassis and suspension were derived from the Fiat 500 and Fiat 124. The 1000, 1500, and 2000 stands for the wattage of the motors respectively. Approximately 500 were made.

The Zele 2000 also featured a boost switch which, once at top speed, weakens the motor's magnetic fields in the field coils to produce less torque but a greater top speed. Its top speed was between 25 and 30 mph.

The American importer for the vehicle, Elcar Corporation, also created an elongated four-seat prototype called the Elcar Wagonette.

See also
List of modern production plug-in electric vehicles

References

External links 
Zagato Elcar 1000 at Motorbase
Zagato History document

Microcars
Cars of Italy
1970s cars
Battery electric vehicle manufacturers
Production electric cars
Electric car models
Electric vehicle manufacturers of Italy